Clasby is a surname. Notable people with the surname include:

 Bob Clasby (born 1960), American American football player
 John Clasby (1891–1932), Australian politician

See also
 Cleasby (surname)